Huntington North Dam (National ID # UT10122) is a dam in Emery County, Utah.

The earthen dam was constructed between 1964 and 1966 by the United States Bureau of Reclamation, with a height of 74 feet and a length of 1907 feet at its crest.  It impounds Huntington Creek for irrigation water storage as part of the Emery County Project.  The dam is owned by the Bureau, and operated by the local Emery Water Conservancy District.

The reservoir it creates, Huntington Lake, has a normal water surface of 242 acres, and a maximum storage capacity of 5,420 acre-feet.  Recreation includes camping, boating, hiking, fishing (for bluegill, sunfish, largemouth bass, and rainbow trout)  and the facilities of the adjacent Huntington State Park.

References

Dams in Utah
Reservoirs in Utah
United States Bureau of Reclamation dams
Dams completed in 1966
Buildings and structures in Emery County, Utah
Lakes of Emery County, Utah
1966 establishments in Utah